The Geometry Festival is an annual mathematics conference held in the United States.

The festival has been held since 1985 at the University of Pennsylvania, the University of Maryland, the University of North Carolina, the State University of New York at Stony Brook, Duke University and New York University's Courant Institute of Mathematical Sciences. It is a three day conference that focuses on the major recent results in geometry and related fields.

Previous Geometry Festival speakers

1985 at Penn
 Marcel Berger
 Pat Eberlein
 Jost Eschenburg
 Friedrich Hirzebruch
 Blaine Lawson
 Leon Simon
 Scott Wolpert
 Deane Yang

1986 at Maryland
 Uwe Abresch, Explicit constant mean curvature tori
 Zhi-yong Gao, The existence of negatively Ricci curved metrics
 David Hoffman, New results in the global theory of minimal surfaces
  Jack Lee, Conformal geometry and the Yamabe problem
 Ngaiming Mok, Compact Kähler manifolds of non-negative curvature
 John Morgan, Self dual connections and the topology of 4-manifolds
 Chuu-Lian Terng, Submanifolds with flat normal bundle

1987 at Penn
 Robert Bryant, The construction of metrics with exceptional holonomy
 Francis Bonahon, Hyperbolic 3-manifolds with arbitrarily short geodesics
 Keith Burns, Geodesic flows on the 2-sphere
 Andreas Floer, Instantons and Casson's invariant
 Hermann Karcher, Embedded minimal surfaces in the 3-sphere
 Jürgen Moser, Minimal foliations of tori
 Edward Witten. Applications of quantum field theory to topology

1988 at North Carolina
 Detlef Gromoll, On complete spaces of non-negative Ricci curvature
 Nicolas Kapouleas, Constant mean curvature surfaces in E3
 Robert Osserman, Gauss map of complete minimal surfaces
 Pierre Pansu, Lp-cohomology of negatively curved manifolds
  Peter Petersen, Bounding homotopy types by geometry
 Gang Tian, Kähler-Einstein metrics on quasiprojective manifolds
 DaGang Yang, Some new examples of manifolds of positive Ricci curvature
 Wolfgang Ziller, Recent results on Einstein metrics

1989 at Stony Brook
 Eugenio Calabi, Extremal singular metrics on surfaces
 Harold Donnelly, Nodal sets of eigenfunctions on Riemannian manifolds
 Yakov Eliashberg, Symplectic geometric methods in several complex variables
 F. Thomas Farrell, A topological analogue of Mostow's rigidity theorem
 Lesley Sibner, Solutions to Yang-Mills equations which are not self-dual
 Carlos Simpson, Moduli spaces of representations of fundamental groups

1990 at Maryland
 Michael T. Anderson, Behavior of metrics under Ricci curvature bounds
 Kevin Corlette, Harmonic maps and geometric superrigidity
 Kenji Fukaya, Fundamental groups of almost non-negatively curved manifolds
 Mikhail Gromov, Recent progress in symplectic geometry
 Werner Müller, On spectral theory for locally symmetric manifolds with finite volume
 Rick Schoen, Least area problems for Lagrangian submanifolds
 Gudlaugur Thorbergsson, Isoparametric submanifolds and their Tits buildings
 Shing-Tung Yau, Some theorems in Kähler geometry

1991 at Duke
 Jeff Cheeger, Transgressed Euler classes of SL(2n,Z)-bundles and adiabatic limits of eta-invariants
 Chris Croke, Volumes of balls in manifolds without conjugate points and rigidity of geodesic flows
 Carolyn Gordon, When you can't hear the shape of a manifold
 Wu-Yi Hsiang, Sphere packing and spherical geometry: The Kepler conjecture and beyond
 Alan Nadel, On the geometry of Fano varieties
 Grigori Perelman, Alexandrov's spaces with curvature bounded from below
 Stephan Stolz, On the space of positive curvature metrics modulo diffeomorphisms

1992 at Courant
 Jonathan Block, Aperiodic tilings, positive scalar curvature and other homological phenomena
 John Franks, Infinitely many closed geodesics on the 2-sphere
 Karsten Grove, The inevitable presence of singular spaces in Riemannian geometry
 Lisa Jeffrey, Volumes of moduli spaces of flat connections on Riemannian surfaces
 Jun Li, Anti-self-dual connections on SU(2) bundles over algebraic surfaces
 Dusa McDuff, Symplectic 4-manifolds
 Clifford Taubes, Anti-self dual conformal structures in 4 dimensions

1993 at Penn
 Shiing-Shen Chern, Finsler geometry
 Richard S. Hamilton, An isoperimetric estimate for the curve-shrinking flow
 Vaughan Jones, Loop groups and operator algebras
 Claude LeBrun, Compact Kähler manifolds of constant scalar curvature
 Louis Nirenberg, The maximum principle and related things
 Xiaochun Rong, Collapsing in low dimensions and rationality of geometric invariants
 Isadore Singer, Geometry and quantum field theory

1995 at Stony Brook
 Dimitri Burago, Asymptotic geometry of Z^n-periodic metrics
 Tobias Colding, Ricci curvature and convergence
 Dominic Joyce, Compact Riemannian manifolds with exceptional holonomy groups
 Yael Karshon, Hamiltonian torus actions
 David Morrison, Analogues of Seiberg–Witten invariants for counting curves on Calabi–Yau manifolds
 Tomasz Mrowka, The Seiberg-Witten equations and 4-manifold topology
 Yongbin Ruan, Higher genus pseudo-holomorphic curves
 Edward Witten, Monopoles and four-manifolds

1996 at Maryland
 John C. Baez, Quantum gravity and BF theory in 4 dimensions
 Jean-Luc Brylinski, Gauge groups and reciprocity laws on algebraic varieties
 Bruce Kleiner, Spaces of nonpositive curvature
 Grigory Margulis, Quantitative Oppenheim Conjecture
 Sergei P. Novikov, Laplace and Darboux transformations
 Richard Schwartz, The Devil's Pentagram
 Guofang Wei, Volume comparison with integral curvature bounds
 Shmuel Weinberger, Equivariant rigidity: For and against

1997 at Duke
 Jeanne Nielsen Clelland, Geometry of Conservation Laws for Parabolic PDE's
 Anatole Katok, Rigidity and invariant geometric structures for differentiable group actions
 François Labourie, Monge-Ampere problems, holomorphic curves and laminations
 Gang Liu, Floer Homology and the Arnold Conjecture
 William Minicozzi II, Harmonic functions on manifolds
 Lorenz Schwachhöfer, The classification of irreducible holonomies of torsion free connections
 Matthias Schwarz, Symplectic fixed points and quantum cohomology
 Stephen Semmes, Geometry with little smoothness

1998 at Stony Brook
 Scott Axelrod, Generalized Chern-Simons invariants as a generalized Lagrangian field theory
 Jean-Michel Bismut, Chern-Simons classes, Bott Chern classes and analytic torsion
 Spencer Bloch, Algebro-geometric Chern-Simons classes
 Robert Bryant, Recent progress on the holonomy classification problem
 Robert Bryant (for S.-S. Chern), Recent results and open problems in Finsler geometry
 Jeff Cheeger and Blaine Lawson, The mathematical work of James Simons
 Jeff Cheeger, Ricci Curvature
 Jürg Fröhlich, Physics and the Chern-Simons form (from anomalies to the quantum Hall effect to magnetic stars)
 Mikhail Gromov, Dynamics on function spaces
 Maxim Kontsevich, On regulators, critical values and q-factorials
 Blaine Lawson, Connections and singularities of maps
 Robert MacPherson, Spaces with torus actions
 John Milnor, Remarks on geometry and dynamics
 I.M. Singer, TBA
 Dennis Sullivan A combinatorial model for non-linearity
 Clifford Taubes, Seiberg-Witten invariants, harmonic forms, and their pseudo-holomorphic curves
 Gang Tian, Yang-Mills connections and calibration
 C.-N. Yang, Vector potentials and connections
 Shing-Tung Yau,  Mirror symmetry and rational curves

1999 at Penn
 Peter Sarnak, Some spectral problems on negatively curved manifolds
 Zheng-xu He, The gradient flow for the Möbius energy of knots
 Curtis McMullen, The moduli space of Riemann surfaces is Kähler-hyperbolic
 Paul Biran, Lagrange skeletons and symplectic rigidity
 Helmut Hofer, Holomorphic curves and contact geometry Werner Ballmann, On negative curvature and the essential spectrum of geometric operators Shlomo Sternberg, Multiplets of representations and Kostant's Dirac operator2000 at Maryland
 Samuel Ferguson, The Kepler Conjecture Robert Meyerhoff, Rigorous computer-aided proofs in the theory of hyperbolic 3-manifolds Herman Gluck, Geometry, topology and plasma physics Burkhard Wilking, New examples of manifolds with positive sectional curvature almost everywhere John Roe, Amenability and assembly maps Eleny Ionel, Gromov invariants of symplectic sums Mikhail Gromov, Spaces of holomorphic maps2001 at Northeastern
 Robert Bryant, Rigidity and quasirigidity of extremal cycles in Hermitian symmetric spaces Tobias Colding, Embedded minimal surfaces in 3-manifolds Boris Dubrovin, Normal forms of integrable PDE's John Lott, Heat equation methods in noncommutative geometry Dusa McDuff, Seminorms on the Hamiltonian group and the nonsqueezing theorem Rick Schoen, Variational approaches to the construction minimal lagrangian submanifolds Shing-Tung Yau,  Mirror symmetry2002 at Courant
 Denis Auroux, Singular plane curves and topological invariants of symplectic manifolds Hugh Bray, On the mass of higher dimensional black holes Alice Chang, Conformally invariant operators and the Gauss-Bonnet integrand Xiuxiong Chen, The space of Kähler metrics George Daskalopoulos, On the Yang-Mills flow in higher dimensions Alex Eskin, Billiards and lattices Juha Heinonen, On the existence of quasiregular mappings2003 at Duke
 Bennett Chow, Harnack estimates of Li–Yau–Hamilton type for the Ricci flow Anda Degeratu, Geometrical McKay Correspondence Ron Donagi, Griffiths' intermediate Jacobians, integrable systems, and string theory John Etnyre, Legendrian knots in high dimensions  Joe Harris, Are Cubics Rational? Claude LeBrun, Zoll Manifolds, Complex Surfaces, and Holomorphic Disks John Morgan, Variations of Hodge structure for 1-parameter families of Calabi–Yau three-folds Madhav Nori, A modified Hodge conjecture Justin Sawon, Twisted Fourier–Mukai transforms for holomorphic symplectic manifolds Wilfried Schmid, Automorphic distributions, L-functions, and functional equations Jeff Viaclovsky, Fully nonlinear equations and conformal geometry Claire Voisin, K-correspondences and intrinsic pseudovolume forms2004 at Courant
 Jean-Michel Bismut, The Hypoelliptic Laplacian on the Cotangent Bundle Yasha Eliashberg, Positive Loops of Contact Transformations Blaine Lawson, Projective Hulls and the Projective Gelfand Transformation Dusa McDuff, Applications of J-holomorphic Curves Xiaochun Rong, Local splitting structures on nonpositively curved manifolds Dennis Sullivan, Algebraic topology in string backgrounds Gang Tian, Extremal Metrics and Holomorphic Discs Edward Witten, Gauge Theory Scattering From Curves In CP32005 at Stony Brook
 Nancy Hingston, Periodic solutions of Hamilton's equations on tori Sergiu Klainerman, Null hypersurfaces and curvature estimates in general relativity Bruce Kleiner, Singular structure of mean curvature flow Frank Pacard, Blowing up Kähler manifolds with constant scalar curvature Rahul Pandharipande, A topological view of Gromov-Witten theory Igor Rodniansky, Non-linear waves and Einstein geometry Yum-Tong Siu, Methods of singular metrics in algebraic geometry Katrin Wehrheim, Floer theories in symplectic topology and gauge theory2006 at Penn
 Jeff Cheeger, Differentiation, bi-Lipschitz nonembedding and embedding Charles Fefferman, Fitting a smooth function to data Helmut Hofer, On the analytic and geometric foundations of symplectic field theory Ko Honda, Reeb vector fields and open book decompositions William H. Meeks, The Dynamics Theorem for embedded minimal surfaces Yair Minsky, Asymptotic geometry of the mapping class group Frank Morgan, Manifolds with Density Zoltan Szabo, Link Floer homology and the  Thurston norm2007 at Maryland
 Dan Freed, Secondary differential-geometric invariants, generalized cohomology, and QCD Xiaobo Lu, Mean curvature flow for isoparametric submanifolds Vitali Kapovitch, Some open problems in comparison geometry Maryam Mirzakhani, Lattice point asymptotics and conformal densities on Teichmüller space
 Charles Epstein, Stein fillings and index theorems Guoliang Yu, Group actions and K-theory Simon Brendle, Blow-up phenomena for the Yamabe PDE in high dimensions2008 at Duke
 Michael Anderson, Conformally compact Einstein metrics with prescribed conformal infinity Robert Bryant, Riemannian Submersions as PDE Greg Galloway, Stability of marginally trapped surfaces with applications to black holes Marcus Khuri, The Yamabe Problem Revisited John Lott, Optimal transport in Riemannian geometry and Ricci flow William Minicozzi, The rate of change of width under flows Duong Phong, Stability and constant scalar curvature Jeff Viaclovsky, Orthogonal Complex Structures2009 at Stony Brook
 Jeff Cheeger,  Quantitative Behavior of Maps from the Heisenberg Group to L1 Marcos Dajczer, Conformal Killing graphs with prescribed mean curvature Karsten Grove,  Positive curvature: the quest for examples Wolfgang Meyer,  The Contributions of Detlef Gromoll to Riemannian Geometry Gabriel Paternain, Transparent Connections over Negatively Curved Surfaces Christina Sormani,  The Intrinsic Flat Distance between Riemannian Manifolds Guofang Wei,  Smooth Metric Measure Spaces2010 at Courant
Tim Austin (UCLA):   Rational group ring elements with kernels having irrational von Neumann dimension
Xiuxiong Chen (UW Madison):   The space of Kaehler metrics
Tobias Colding (MIT):   Sharp Hölder continuity of tangent cones for spaces with a lower Ricci curvature bound and applications
Marianna Csörnyei (University College London and Yale): Tangents of null sets
Larry Guth (U Toronto):   Contraction of surface areas vs. topology of mappings
Jeremy Kahn (Stony Brook):   Essential immersed surfaces in closed hyperbolic three-manifolds
Gang Tian (Princeton):  Kähler–Ricci flow through finite-time singularities

2011 at Penn
Hubert Bray (Duke): On dark matter, spiral galaxies, and the axioms of general relativity
Tobias Colding (MIT): Generic mean curvature flow
Claude LeBrun (Stony Brook): On Hermitian Einstein 4-manifolds
Natasa Sesum (Rutgers): Yamabe Solitons
Pete Storm (Jane Street Capital): Infinitesimal rigidity of hyperbolic manifolds with totally geodesic boundary
Brian Weber (Courant): Regularity and convergence of extremal Kaehler metrics
Shing-Tung Yau (Harvard): An appreciation of Eugenio Calabi and his work
Shing-Tung Yau (Harvard): Quasi-local mass in general relativity

2012 at Duke
John Etnyre (Georgia Institute of Technology): Surgery and tight contact structures
Valentino Tosatti (Columbia University): The evolution of a Hermitian metric by its Chern-Ricci curvature
Carla Cederbaum (Duke University): From Newton to Einstein:  A guided tour through space and time
Jan Metzger (Institute for Mathematics, University of Potsdam	): On isoperimetric surfaces in asymptotically flat manifolds
Fernando Codá Marques (IMPA, Brazil): Min-max theory and the Willmore conjecture
Yanir Rubinstein (Stanford University): Einstein metrics on Kähler manifolds
Simon Brendle (Stanford University): Rotational symmetry of self-similar solutions to the Ricci flow
Mu-Tao Wang (Columbia University): A variational problem for isometric embeddings and its applications in general relativity
Gordana Matic (University of Georgia): Contact invariant in Sutured Floer Homology and fillability

2013 at Maryland
Bo Berndtsson (Chalmers University): Variations of Bergman kernels and symmetrization of plurisubharmonic functions
Simon Donaldson (Imperial College, London): Kähler-Einstein metrics, extremal metrics and stability
Hans-Joachim Hein (Imperial College, London): Singularities of Kähler-Einstein metrics and complete Calabi–Yau manifolds
Peter Kronheimer (Harvard University): Instanton homology for knots and webs
Andrea Malchiodi (SISSA): Uniformization of surfaces with conical singularities
Aaron Naber (MIT): Characterizations of bounded Ricci curvature and applications
Yuval Peres (Microsoft Research): The geometry of fair allocation to random points
Brian White (Stanford University): Gap theorems for minimal submanifolds of spheres

2014 at Stony Brook
Robert Bryant (Duke University): Rolling surfaces and exceptional geometry
Alice Chang (Princeton University): On positivity of a class of conformal covariant operators
Mihalis Dafermos (Princeton University): On null singularities for the Einstein vacuum equations and the strong cosmic censorship conjecture in general relativity
Kenji Fukaya (Stony Brook): Mirror symmetry between Toric A model and LG B model: some recent progress
Matthew Gursky (Notre Dame University): Critical metrics on connected sums of Einstein four-manifolds
Robert Haslhofer (New York University): Mean curvature flow with surgery
Andre Neves (Imperial College): Existence of minimal hypersurfaces
Song Sun (Stony Brook): Kähler-Einstein metrics: Gromov-Hausdorff limits and algebraic geometry

2015 at Courant
Gábor Székelyhidi (Notre Dame): Kahler-Einstein metrics along the smooth continuity method
Blaine Lawson (Stony Brook): Potential theory for nonlinear PDE's
John Pardon (Stanford): Existence of Lefschetz vibrations on Stein/Weinstein domains
Raanan Schul (Stony Brook): Qualitative and quantitative rectifiability
Ursula Hamenstädt (Bonn): A Gromov/Thurston rigidity theorem for hyperbolic groups
Tatiana Toro (Washington): Almost minimizers with free boundary
Richard Bamler (Berkeley): There are finitely many surgeries in Perelman's Ricci flow

2016 at Princeton
Claude LeBrun (Stony Brook): Mass in Kähler Geometry
Ian Agol (UC Berkeley and IAS): Pseudo-Anosov stretch factors and homology of mapping tori
Davi Maximo (Stanford): Minimal surfaces with bounded index
Fernando Marques (Princeton): Morse index and multiplicity of min-max minimal hypersurfaces
Nancy Hingston (The College of New Jersey): Loop Products, Index Growth, and Dynamics
Jennifer Hom (Georgia Tech and IAS): Symplectic four-manifolds and Heegaard Floer homology
Fengbo Hang (NYU, Courant): Fourth order Paneitz operator and Q curvature equation
Jake Solomon (Hebrew University): The space of positive Lagrangians 

2017 at Duke
Lucas Ambrozio (Imperial College) - Some new results for free boundary minimal surfaces
Otis Chodosh (Princeton) - Some new results on the global geometry of scalar curvatureMark Haskins (Imperial College)
Chi Li (Purdue) - On metric tangent cones at Klt singularitiesMarco Radeschi (Notre Dame) - "When all geodesics are closed"
Christina Sormani (CUNY) - "The Limits of Sequences of manifolds with Nonnegative Scalar Curvature"
Jeff Streets (UC Irvine) - Generalized Kahler Ricci flow and a generalized Calabi conjecture

2018 at Penn
Jean-Pierre Bourguignon (IHES)
Eugenio Calabi (Penn)
Yakov Eliashberg (Stanford)
Carolyn S. Gordon (Dartmouth)
Daniel Ketover (Princeton)
Yevgeny Liokumovich (MIT)
Rick Schoen (UC Irvine)
Jenny Wilson (Stanford)

2019 at Maryland
 Yann Brenier (ETH, Zurich) - Fluid Mechanics and Geometry Dietmar Salamon (CNRS, DMA-École Normale Supérieure ) - Moment maps in symplectic and Kähler geometry Aleksandr Logunov (IAS, Princeton) - Zero sets of Laplace eigenfunctions Jim Bryan (University of British Columbia) AG - The enumerative geometry and arithmetic of some of the world’s Tiniest Calabi–Yau threefolds Yi Wang (Johns Hopkins University) - Boundary operator associated to σk curvature Steven Zelditch (Northwestern University) - Spectral asymptotics on stationary spacetimes Xuwen Zhu (University of California, Berkeley) Spherical Metrics with Conical Singularities Alex Wright (University of Michigan) - Nearly Fuchsian surface subgroups of finite covolume Kleinian groups2021 at Stony Brook (via Zoom) 
 Joel Spruck (Johns Hopkins University) - A Personal Tribute to Louis Nirenberg Akito Futaki (Yau Center, Tsinghua) - Deformation Quantization, and Obstructions to the Existence of Closed Star Products Jean-Pierre Demailly (Institut Fourier, Grenoble) - Holomorphic Morse Inequalities, Old and New Tristan Collins (MIT) - SYZ Mirror Symmetry for del Pezzo Surfaces Jim Isenberg (University of Oregon) - Some Recent Results on Ricci Flow Chiu-Chu Melissa Liu (Columbia University) -  Topological Recursion and Crepant Transformation Conjecture Bing Wang (USTC)  - Local entropy along the Ricci flow Simon Donaldson (SCGP, Stony Brook/  Imperial College, London) - Some boundary value and mapping problems for differential forms2022 at Courant (online)
Panagiota Daskalopoulos (Columbia University) - Ancient solutions to geometric flowsJingyin Huang (The Ohio State University) - The Helly geometry of some fundamental groups of complex hyperplane arrangement complementsWenshuai Jiang (Zhejiang University) - Gromov–Hausdorff limit of manifolds and some applicationsChao Li (Courant Institute of Mathematical Sciences) - The geometry and topology of scalar curvature in low dimensionsCiprian Manolescu (Stanford University) - A knot Floer stable homotopy typeAssaf Naor (Princeton University) - Extension, separation and isomorphic reverse isoperimetryAndré Neves (University of Chicago) - Geodesics and minimal surfacesLu Wang (Yale University) - Hypersurfaces of low entropy are isotopically trivialRuobing Zhang (Princeton University) - Metric geometry of Calabi–Yau manifolds in complex dimension two''

References

External links
XIIth Geometry Festival, 1997
 XIIIth Geometry Festival, 1998
XVIIth  Geometry Festival, 2002
XVIIIth  Geometry Festival, 2003
XIXth Geometry Festival, 2004
 XXth Geometry Festival, 2005 
23rd Geometry Festival, 2008
24th  Geometry Festival 2009 in memory of Detlef Gromoll
27th Geometry Festival, 2012
29th Geometry Festival, 2014
30th Geometry Festival, 2015
31st Geometry Festival, 2016
32nd Geometry Festival, 2017
33rd Geometry Festival, 2018
34th Geometry Festival, 2019
35th Geometry Festival, 2021
36th Geometry Festival, 2022

Mathematics conferences